William Henry Hogan (September 14, 1884 – September 28, 1974) was an American Major League Baseball outfielder. He also attended Santa Clara University and was the brother of George Hogan.

In 238 games over two seasons, Hogan posted a .236 batting average (194-for-822) with 86 runs, 3 home runs, 100 RBI, 35 stolen bases and 77 bases on balls.

References

1884 births
1974 deaths
Major League Baseball outfielders
Philadelphia Athletics players
St. Louis Browns players
Baseball players from California
Oakland Oaks (baseball) players
San Francisco Seals (baseball) players
Spokane Indians players
Tacoma Tigers players
Santa Clara University alumni